Torralba is a surname, and people with this surname include:

 Eduardo Torralba Beci (1881–1929), Spanish journalist and politician
 Ramón Torralba (1895–1986), Spanish football player
 Unique Torralba Salonga (born 2000), Filipino musician known as Unique (musician)

See also
 Torralba (disambiguation)

Spanish-language surnames
Spanish words and phrases